The 2007–08 CHL season was the 16th season of the Central Hockey League (CHL).

Regular season

Conference standings

Note: y - clinched conference title; x - clinched playoff spot; e - eliminated from playoff contention

Playoffs

Playoff Bracket

Awards
Source:Central Hockey League Historical Award Winners 
Ray Miron President’s Cup (Playoff Champions) - Arizona Sundogs
Governors’ Cup (regular-season champions) - Bossier-Shreveport Mudbugs 
Most Valuable Player - Jeff Bes, Laredo
Most Outstanding Goaltender - John DeCaro, Bossier-Shreveport 
Most Outstanding Defenseman - Vladimir Hartinger, New Mexico 
Rookie of the Year - David Nimmo, Amarillo 
Coach of the Year - Scott Muscutt, Bossier-Shreveport
Man of the Year - Stacey Bauman, Oklahoma City
Rick Kozuback Award - Chris Stewart, Colorado
Joe Burton Award (Scoring Champion) - Alex Leavitt, Arizona
Playoff Most Valuable Player - Rob McVicar, Arizona
All-Star Game Most Valuable Player (North) - Brent Cullaton, Rocky Mountain
All-Star Game Most Valuable Player (South) - Alex Leavitt, Arizona
Athletic Trainer of the Year – Wade Sundbye, Oklahoma City 
Equipment Manager of the Year– Patrick Stevens, Rocky Mountain

All-CHL Team
Forward: Jeff Bes, Laredo
Forward: Alex Leavitt, Arizona 
Forward: Brent Cullaton, Rocky Mountain 
Defenseman: Vladimir Hartinger, New Mexico  
Defenseman: Aaron Schneekloth, Colorado 
Goaltender : John DeCaro, Bossier-Shreveport

All-Rookie Team
Forward - Tyler Skworchinski, Texas 
Forward - Mark Kolanos, Arizona   
Forward - David Nimmo, Amarillo 
Defenseman - Shaun Arvai, Amarillo 
Defenseman - David Schlemko, Arizona 
Goaltender - Alexandre Vincent, Odessa

References

External links
 2007–08 CHL season at The Internet Hockey Database

Chl Season, 2007-08
Central Hockey League seasons